Flea Hill is an unincorporated community in Sussex County, Delaware, United States. Flea Hill is located on U.S. Route 9, southwest of Georgetown.

Flea Hill has been noted for its unusual place name.

References

Unincorporated communities in Sussex County, Delaware
Unincorporated communities in Delaware